Netiv HaGdud is an Israeli settlement organized as a moshav in the West Bank. Located in the Jordan Valley around twenty kilometres north of Jericho, it falls under the jurisdiction of Bik'at HaYarden Regional Council.

The international community considers Israeli settlements in the West Bank illegal under international law, but the Israeli government disputes this.

History
According to ARIJ, in order to construct Netiv HaGdud, Israel confiscated land from two nearby Palestinian villages:  215 dunams(215000 m2) from Fasayil, and 993 dunams (993,000 m2) from Al-Auja.

The settlement was established in April 1975 by members who had been preparing in Ma'ale Efraim, and was named after the 38th Battalion of the Jewish legion, which fought in the Jordan Valley during World War I. In May 1977 it moved to its present site.

A nearby archaeological site, which has been excavated by Ofer Bar-Yosef amongst others, has produced remains from the Neolithic era, including Pre-Pottery Neolithic A.

References

Moshavim
Israeli settlements in the West Bank
Populated places established in 1975
1975 establishments in the Israeli Military Governorate